The Hopfner HV-6/28 was a small airliner built in Austria in the late 1920s for Swiss use. Unrelated to Hopfner's other airliners of the period, the HV-6/28 was a conventional, high-wing, strut-braced monoplane with a fully enclosed cabin. The main units of the fixed tailskid undercarriage were divided. The single example built was flown by Aero St. Gallen between 1929 and 1931, and then scrapped.

Specifications

References

External links
 Уголок неба

1920s Austrian airliners
Hopfner aircraft
Aircraft first flown in 1929
High-wing aircraft
Single-engined tractor aircraft